Tiny Toon Adventures: Dizzy's Candy Quest is the second Tiny Toon Adventures-related game released on the Nintendo Game Boy Color, published in October 2001 by Conspiracy Entertainment. It was developed by Formula, a handheld division of Lost Boys Games.

Plot
Montana Max has built a robot to steal all of the candy in the world for Elmyra Duff. However, the robot wasn't programmed all that well, so they've also cloned Hamton J. Pig, Sweetie Pie, and Gogo Dodo as well as others to retrieve the robot for reprogramming. One obstacle stands in their way: Dizzy Devil.

Dizzy Devil ends up saving the robot and the two team up to find candy and stop Montana Max, facing all of the clones on the way.

Gameplay
The game features 25 levels and 5 boss levels. There is also a password feature to allow access to all levels. In each level Dizzy will have a number of candy items to collect before the timer runs out. The objectives are given by the robot. To get the candies, Dizzy has to avoid tricks and traps (and later the clones) and not fall off the edge of the level. His spinning ability can be used to speed across various floors with ease. In a boss level Dizzy will need to do specific actions to defeat the robotic boss.

References

External links

2001 video games
Game Boy Color games
Platform games
Video games about food and drink
Video games based on Tiny Toon Adventures
Video games developed in the Netherlands
Video games scored by Joris de Man
Game Boy Color-only games
Conspiracy Entertainment games
Single-player video games